Fadwa A. Hammoud is the Chief Deputy Attorney General of Michigan and the former Solicitor General of Michigan.

Early life and education
At age 11, Hammoud emigrated to the United States from Lebanon. Hammoud graduated from Fordson High School. Hammoud earned a B.A. in political science and communications from the University of Michigan–Dearborn and a J.D. from Wayne State University Law School. In 2018, Hammoud was a member of the Harvard Business School’s Young American Leaders Program.

Career
Hammoud has clerked for United States District Court Judge George Steeh. Hammoud has also served as assistant prosecuting attorney for Wayne County, Michigan and as leading prosecutting attorney for Wayne County. On November 8, 2016, Hammoud was elected as a member of Dearborn Board of Education.  In January 2019, Hammoud was appointed by Michigan Attorney General Dana Nessel as Solicitor General of Michigan. On February 18, 2019, Hammoud took the oath of office and was sworn in. Hammoud is the first Arab-American solicitor general in the United States. In March 2019, Hammoud resigned from both the Dearborn Board of Education and as a trustee as Henry Ford College. As solicitor general, Hammoud was put in charge of the Flint water crisis investigations. On April 16, 2019, Hammoud fired Todd Flood, a special prosecutor appointed by the previous administration's attorney general, claiming he failed to "fully and properly" pursue potentially important evidence in the water crisis criminal cases. Hammoud served as a Trustee and Treasurer of the Dearborn Public Schools Board of Education and the Henry Ford College Board.

Former Michigan Govenor Rick Snyder appointed Hammoud to the Commission on Middle Eastern American Affairs. She also served on the Legislative Committee for the Hispanic/Latino, Asian Pacific American and Middle Eastern American Affairs Commissions. In 2018, Hammoud was a member of the Harvard Business School’s Young American Leaders Program. On December 7, 2022 Michigan Attorney General Dana Nessel announced the appointment of Fadwa A. Hammoud as Chief Deputy Attorney General.

Notable cases

In October 2021, Hammoud became the first Muslim Arab American woman to argue a case before the U.S. Supreme Court. The case in question was Brown v. Davenport.

Personal life
Hammoud is Muslim. She is the first Muslim solicitor general in the United States.

References

Living people
American Muslims
County officials in Michigan
Lebanese emigrants to the United States
People from Dearborn, Michigan
Solicitors General of Michigan
University of Michigan–Dearborn alumni
Wayne State University Law School alumni
21st-century American lawyers
21st-century American women lawyers
Year of birth missing (living people)